Oenopota ogasawarana is a species of sea snail, a marine gastropod mollusk in the family Mangeliidae.

Description

Distribution
This marine species occurs on the Kaikata Seamount, west off Ogasawara Islands, Japan. at depths between 440 m and 450 m

References

 Okutani, T., Fujikura, K. & Sasaki, T. 1993b. New taxa and new distribution records of deepsea gastropods collected from or near the chemosynthetic communities in the Japanese waters. Bulletin of National Science Museum, Tokyo, Series A 19: 123–143
 Sasaki, Takenori, Takashi Okutani, and Katsunori Fujikura. "Molluscs from hydrothermal vents and cold seeps in Japan: a review of taxa recorded in twenty recent years (1984–2004)." Venus 64.3–4 (2005): 87–133

External links
  Tucker, J.K. 2004 Catalog of recent and fossil turrids (Mollusca: Gastropoda). Zootaxa 682:1–1295.

ogasawarana
Gastropods described in 1993